This is a list of listed buildings in Gladsaxe Municipality, Denmark.

The list

References

External links
 Danish Agency of Culture

 
Gladsaxe